There are over 20,000 Grade II* listed buildings in England. This page is a list of these buildings in the district of High Peak in Derbyshire.

List of buildings

|}

See also
 Grade I listed buildings in Derbyshire
 Grade II* listed buildings in Amber Valley
 Grade II* listed buildings in Bolsover (district)
 Grade II* listed buildings in Chesterfield
 Grade II* listed buildings in Derby
 Grade II* listed buildings in Derbyshire Dales
 Grade II* listed buildings in Erewash
 Grade II* listed buildings in North East Derbyshire
 Grade II* listed buildings in South Derbyshire
 Listed buildings in New Mills

Notes

External links

 
Lists of Grade II* listed buildings in Derbyshire
High Peak, Derbyshire